George Henry Smillie (December 29, 1840–1921) was an American painter and etcher. The brother of artist James David Smillie, he studied under his father, James Smillie, and under James McDougal Hart, and became a member of the National Academy of Design in 1882. Like his brother, he painted both in oils and in water colour. His favourite subjects were scenes along the New England coast. In 1881 he married Nellie Sheldon Jacobs (b. 1854), a painter of genre pictures in oils and water colour.

References

External links
 
 

1840 births
1921 deaths
19th-century American painters
19th-century American male artists
American male painters
20th-century American painters
American landscape painters
National Academy of Design members
20th-century American male artists